Lara Käpplein (born 25 May 1995) is a German badminton player.

Achievements

BWF International Challenge/Series 
Women's doubles

  BWF International Challenge tournament
  BWF International Series tournament
  BWF Future Series tournament

References

External links 
 

1995 births
Living people
People from Bruchsal
Sportspeople from Karlsruhe (region)
German female badminton players
Badminton players at the 2019 European Games
European Games competitors for Germany